The Luena River in eastern Angola rises near the town of Luena, Angola and flows south-east to the Zambezi. The name is also used for an ethnic group in the area, the Luena people.

Rivers of Angola
Tributaries of the Zambezi River